Attila Soós Jr. (born 27 August 1971) is a Hungarian equestrian. He competed at the 1992 Summer Olympics and the 1996 Summer Olympics.

References

External links
 

1971 births
Living people
Hungarian male equestrians
Olympic equestrians of Hungary
Equestrians at the 1992 Summer Olympics
Equestrians at the 1996 Summer Olympics
People from Kiskunhalas
Sportspeople from Bács-Kiskun County